Taio is a comune in the province of Trento, Italy

Taio may also refer to:
Taio Cruz, English R&B singer
Taio Matsuo, fictional character in Sakigake!! Otokojuku
Teremoana Tapi Taio, Cook Islands politician
Taius, Spanish author and bishop
Tai O, Lantau Island, Hong Kong
Taió, a town in Brazil

See also
Tayo (disambiguation)